Brooke Mills Simpson is an American singer and actress. She finished in third place in the thirteenth season on NBC's talent singing competition The Voice on Team Miley Cyrus.

In 2021, she auditioned for season 16 of America's Got Talent. She received a yes vote from each judge and advanced to the quarter finals round placing fourth in the finals.

Early life 
Brooke Simpson was born to an evangelical family. She discovered she loved singing at age 7. During her childhood she traveled and performed with her family; they attended pow wows hosted by the Haliwa-Saponi tribe. Simpson is a member of the tribe. Before appearing on The Voice, she moved from her hometown of Hollister, North Carolina to Fort Lauderdale, Florida with her husband, Ray Simpson. She was considering other careers instead of singing. Her parents are Jimille and Mike Mills; she has two siblings who are eight years younger: sister Leah and brother Mikey.

Brooke Simpson met her vocal coach Andrez Franco in 2013.

Career

The Voice 

Simpson auditioned in 2017 for the thirteenth season of The Voice. In the blind auditions which were broadcast on October 1, 2017, she sang "Stone Cold" by Demi Lovato. The four judges, Adam Levine, Cyrus, Jennifer Hudson, and Blake Shelton turned around. She chose to be part of Team Miley finishing in third place on December 19, 2017.

The Voice performances – Studio version of performance reached the top 10 on iTunes

 1776 Revival 
Simpson played Roger Sherman as part of the 1776 revival at the American Repertory Theater in Boston MA.

 Discography Releases from The Voice
2017: "Stone Cold"
2017: "You're a Big Girl Now" (with Sophia Bollman)
2017: "(You Make Me Feel Like) A Natural Woman"
2017: "It's a Man's Man's Man's World"
2017: "Praying"
2017: "What about Us"
2017: "Amazing Grace"
2017: "Earned It" (with Davon Fleming)
2017: "Faithfully"
2017: "Wrecking Ball" (with Miley Cyrus)
2017: "O Holy Night"
2017: "What Is Beautiful"

Singles 

2017: "What Is Beautiful"
2018: "2 AM"
2018: "Perfect"
2019: "Little Bit Crazy"
2019: "Stick Like Honey"
2020: "Real Long Nails"

References 

1991 births
America's Got Talent contestants
Living people
The Voice (franchise) contestants
People from Hollister, North Carolina
Singers from North Carolina
21st-century American singers
21st-century American women singers
Native American singers
21st-century Native American women
21st-century Native Americans